Kusum Devi is an Indian politician and widow of Subhash Singh who is serving in the 17th Bihar Assembly from Gopalganj Assembly constituency.

References 

Bihar MLAs 2020–2025

Year of birth missing (living people)
Living people